|}

The Garnet Stakes is a Listed flat horse race in Ireland open to thoroughbred fillies and mares aged three years or older. It is run at Naas over a distance of 1 mile (1,609 metres), and it is scheduled to take place each year in October.

The race was first run in 2005.

Winners

See also
 Horse racing in Ireland
 List of Irish flat horse races

References
Racing Post:

Flat races in Ireland
Mile category horse races for fillies and mares
Naas Racecourse